Little Knife River may refer to:

 Little Knife River (Lake County, Minnesota)
 Little Knife River (St. Louis County, Minnesota)

See also 
 Knife River (disambiguation)